Westhaven is an unincorporated community in Humboldt County, California. For census purposes it is amalgamated into Westhaven-Moonstone. The ZIP Code is 95570.

References

Unincorporated communities in Humboldt County, California
Unincorporated communities in California